The London Varsity is an annual university rugby union match contested between King's College Rugby Club and University College, the two founding colleges of the University of London. The Varsity is traditionally known as the "Jeremy George Cup" named after the founders of the respective universities, Jeremy Bentham and King George IV.  Founded in 2004 by Adam Sommerfeld, the game celebrates the rivalry between King's College London and University College London which spans nearly two centuries.

The London Varsity is held at the very end of the University Rugby season in March and until 2011 was held at Richmond Athletic Ground. In 2012 the game took place for the first time at the Twickenham Stoop.

In 2014, the London Varsity expanded to include six other sports with fixtures taking place over a week from 7 to 14 March, and is known as the London Varsity Series.

Charity and programme 

Every Year a charity is supported at the game with previous sponsors including KPMG and Adamant Partners.

Results 

In the modern era:

Men's Games:

2004: UCL 19–7 KCL 
2005: UCL 11–7 KCL 
2006: UCL 
2007: UCL 18–5 KCL 
2008: UCL 
2009: KCL 12  -10 UCL 
2010: UCL 
2011: KCL 17–15 UCL
2012: UCL 24–7 KCL 
2013: Not played
2014: UCL 16–9 KCL
2015: KCL 37–10 UCL
2016: KCL 23–11 UCL
2017: UCL 16 –10 KCL
2018: UCL 15 –11 KCL
2019: Not played
2020: KCL 27–12 UCL
2021: UCL 49–7 KCL

2022: UCL 12-8 KCL

Women's Games:

2007: UCL 
2008: UCL 
2009: UCL 
2010: UCL 
2011: UCL 38–5 KCL 
2012: UCL 28–5 KCL 
2013: Not played 
2014: UCL 10–7 KCL 
2015: UCL 30–12 KCL 
2016: KCL 48–0 UCL 
2017: KCL 17–0 UCL 
2018: KCL 5–0 UCL 
2019: UCL 15–10 KCL 
2020: KCL 29–10 UCL

The London Varsity Series 

In 2014, a decision was made jointly by University College London Union and King's College London Students' Union to expand the varsity competition to include six sports in addition to the traditional rugby fixture.

Since 2014 the London Varsity series has flourished, becoming a staple feature in the calendar of both universities and now including over 30 sporting fixtures played across one week in March.

The lineup for the 2018 London Varsity Series included fixtures in:
 American Football
 Hockey 
 Football
 Baseball
 Lacrosse
 Ultimate Frisbee
 Tennis
 Badminton
 Basketball
 Swimming
 Water Polo
 Rowing
 Netball
 Muay Thai Kickboxing
 Taekwondo
 Fencing
 Rugby Union
 Pole Fitness

The fixtures usually include both a men's and women's game and the Hockey, Netball and Football fixtures include matches between both unions' hockey clubs as well as both unions' medics' hockey clubs.

Every year an overall Player of The Series Award is a presented to the outstanding performer of the series. The inaugural winner of The Player of The Series Award was Septimus Theodoulou Knox from UCLU Men's Rugby.

See also 
KCLSU
UCLU
The Varsity Match
The Scottish Varsity
RFU

References

External links 
 The London Varsity Series 2014
 The London Varsity 2012
King's College London
KCLSU
King's Rugby
UCL

Rugby union in London
Student sport rivalries in the United Kingdom
Student sport in London